The Basque Shepherd Dog, is a traditional Spanish breed of sheepdog originating in the historic Basque Country. It is believed that they originated from Central European herding dogs.

It is one of five Basque breeds of dog – the others being the Erbi Txakur, the Pachón de Vitoria, the Villano de Las Encartaciones and the Villanuco de Las Encartaciones – and one of fourteen animal breeds native to the País Vasco.

History 

The Euskal Artzain Txakurra is a traditional breed of the Basque people, and dogs of this type appear in Basque mythology. Similar dogs appear in frescoes in churches and monasteries of the Basque country from the sixteenth century onwards, and later also in the drawings and paintings of artists such as Luis Paret y Alcázar, Gustave Doré and Adolfo Guiard.

The breed was recognised by the Real Sociedad Canina de España in January 1996 in two varieties, Iletsua and Gorbeiakoa; the Gorbeiakoa originates from the region of Gorbea, and Iletsua means "hairy" or "shaggy" in Basque. It was officially recognised – and the breed standard published – by the national government of Spain in 2001, initially only in the Gorbeiakoa type; the Iletsua variant was recognised in the following year. Also in 2001, the breed in both its variants was included in the official list of autochthonous Basque breeds published by the government of the Basque Autonomous Community; specific legislation regulating breeding and registration was published in 2003.

In 2009 the total number of both subtypes of the breed was estimated to be 500. Although the Gorbeiakoa is historically linked to the municipios of the Parque Natural del Gorbeia, both it and the Iletsua are distributed throughout the historical Basque region.

In the 1950s some Basque people took sheepdogs with them when they travelled to the United States to work as shepherds.

Characteristics 

The two varieties have many features in common. The body is strong and rectangular in outline, usually some 10–20% longer than it is high. The eyes are oval and may be brown or amber, the ears are of medium size, triangular and either pendent or folded.

The Gorbeiakoa has a soft smooth coat of moderate length, shorter on the face and on the front of the legs, and somewhat longer on the back of them. It may be either fire-red or fawn; if it is red, some darkening of the muzzle is common.

The coat of the Iletsua variety is a rougher and wirier than that of the Gorbeiakoa. It is moderately long, rather shorter on the front of the legs. It my be either cinnamon-coloured or fawn.

Use 
The Euskal Artzain Txakurra has for centuries been used by shepherds of the Basque Country to guard and herd flocks of sheep. It has also been used in the management of flocks of goats and of herds of cattle or horses, and to guard farmhouses. 

It is the dog most commonly used in txakur probak, traditional Basque sheepdog trials. It has also been successful in sheepdog trials at international level, including those held since 1950 at Oñati, in south-western Gipuzkoa.

References

Dog breeds originating in the Basque Country (autonomous community)
Herding dogs
Basque domestic animal breeds